Multicentric reticulohistiocytosis is a multisystem disease beginning usually around the age of 50 years, and is twice as common in women.

See also 
 Reticulohistiocytosis
 List of cutaneous conditions

References

External links 

Monocyte- and macrophage-related cutaneous conditions